"New York" is a song by Northern Irish alternative rock group Snow Patrol. The track is the third single from the band's sixth studio album, Fallen Empires. It was released as a digital download on 20 December 2011 in the US.

Background and writing 
Snow Patrol frontman Gary Lightbody struggled with writer's block when penning Fallen Empires. Speaking to Q magazine, the singer explained how a chance meeting with R.E.M. vocalist Michael Stipe at a Californian studio rejuvenated his writing process. He recalled, "I couldn't even write my name on a cheque. It was that bad at the time ... (Stipe arriving at the studio) was amazing because the first song I ever played live was R.E.M.'s 'Find the River' at a school concert." Although Stipe's input was minimal, it was enough to inspire Lightbody to rediscover his muse. He recalled, "Michael just made a few suggestions here and there. On a track called 'New York' there was a line, 'Your face has never left me.' He said, 'That sounds like you've got a girl's head in your bag.' So we changed that."

Lightbody explained the story behind the piano ballad: "I always try to write about personal experiences - 'New York' is about a girl I was seeing over there. We both had strong feelings for one another, but we were never in the same place at the same time. It's about missed opportunities." Lightbody penned this song with Snow Patrol pianist Johnny McDaid in his London studio.

Promotion
The song was featured in the "Suddenly" episode of Grey's Anatomy, which aired on 5 January 2012. Snow Patrol performed it live on 9 January 2012 on American late-night talk show Late Show with David Letterman. This song was also featured in Season 4 Episode 10 of The Vampire Diaries.

Critical reception
Jon Young from Spin wrote that the somber "New York" calls out, "Come on / Come out / Come here," to a faraway lover with persuasive fervor. Mike Haydock from BBC Music wrote that "New York and In the End are the massive, sweeping songs that form the heart of Fallen Empires."
Michael Tedder from Paste Magazine refers to "New York" as "a memorable melody, which will probably be in a million TV dramas". Chad Grischow from IGN Music calls it a power-ballad and "one of many instantly memorable offerings" on the album.

Music video
The official music video was released on 30 March 2012. The video shows Gary Lightbody, the band's frontman sitting at a bar, lonely and looking upset, while having drink after drink.
"Ignoring all the dancing and smiling faces around him, the frontman stares into space. His lip-synching is even half-hearted, as he's lost in thought about a relationship that didn’t work out...The emotional video is simple but powerful."

Track listing

Chart performance

References

2010s ballads
2011 singles
Rock ballads
Snow Patrol songs
Songs about New York City
Songs written by Gary Lightbody
Songs written by Johnny McDaid